The 2020 UT Martin Skyhawks football team represented the University of Tennessee at Martin as a member of the Ohio Valley Conference (OVC) during the 2020–21 NCAA Division I FCS football season. Led by 15th-year head coach Jason Simpson, the Skyhawks compiled an overall record of 3–4 with an identical mark in conference play, placing fifth in the OVC. UT Martin played home games at Graham Stadium in Martin, Tennessee.

Previous season
The Skyhawks finished the 2019 season 7–5, 6–2 in OVC play to finish in third place.

Schedule
UT Martin had a game scheduled against Alabama, which was canceled due to the COVID-19 pandemic.

References

UT Martin
UT Martin Skyhawks football seasons
UT Martin Skyhawks football